O Viso is a small village with less than one hundred people. It is part of the parish of San Mamede, Carnota which a member of the county of Carnota. The province is A Coruña and the autonomous community is Galicia.

Economy
The village has two bars one being named Nosa Terra and Tapas Lito. In addition there is a hardware shop, shoe repair shop, and ironsmith, and a hairdresser.

Climate
The region is categorized as an Oceanic climate by the Köppen climate classification. The colder months tend to be very rainy with temperatures in the 40s (°F) to 50s. While the warmer months usually have temperature ranging in the 60s (°F) to 70s. O Viso tends to have a very strong North-northeast(NNE) wind which can last for several days non stop.

Infrastructure
Most of O Viso is houses with a few bars, stores, and a preschool.

Future infrastructure

The newest addition is a building that will be used as a center for local activities. This building has been under construction for several years and has costed the local government over one million euros. The final cost and completion is unknown as of the 3rd of October 2017.

Campo de Viso

The campo de viso is an area in the village that include a children's playground, soccer field, basketball court, and the local preschool. It is also the location for the future local activities building and the Fiestas de San Mamede.

Festivals

The festivals for all of San Mamede are held here along with other activities such as Mamevision. The festivals occur on the 7th, 8th, and 9 August. It is famous for bringing some of the top Orquestas in Galicia. Such as Orquesta Panorama, Orquesta Paris de Noia, Orquest Ache, Orquesta Cinema, etc.

References

Sources

Populated places in the Province of A Coruña